ZAZ Zaporozhets was a series of rear-wheel-drive superminis (city cars in their first generation) designed and built from 1958 at the ZAZ factory in Soviet Ukraine. Different models of the Zaporozhets, all of which had an air-cooled engine in the rear, were produced until 1994. Since the late 1980s, the final series, 968M, was replaced by the cardinally different ZAZ-1102 Tavria hatchback, which featured a front-wheel drive and a more powerful water-cooled engine.

The name Zaporozhets translates into a Cossack of the Zaporizhian Sich or а man from Zaporizhzhia or the Zaporizhzhia Oblast.

Zaporozhets is still well known in many former Soviet states. Like the Volkswagen Beetle or East Germany's Trabant, the Zaporozhets was destined to become a "people's car" of the Soviet Union, and as such it was the most affordable vehicle of its era. At the same time, it was rather sturdy and known for its excellent performance on poor roads. Another important advantage of the Zaporozhets was its ease of repair. The car's appearance gave birth to several nicknames that became well known across the Soviet Union: horbatyi ("hunchback", owing to ZAZ-965's insect-like form; although ZAZ factory workers never used this nickname), malysh, ushastyi ("big-eared", due to 966 and 968's round air intakes on each side of the car to cool the rear-mounted engine), zapor ("constipation"), mylnitsa ("soap-box", for ZAZ-968M, lacking "ears" and producing a more box-like appearance).

Numerous special versions of the Zaporozhets were produced, equipped with additional sets of controls that allowed operating the car with a limited set of limbs, and were given for free or with considerable discounts to disabled people, especially war veterans - similar to SMZ-series microcars. These mobility cars would at times take up to 25% of ZAZ factory output.

First generation (1960-1969)

ZAZ-965
The ZAZ 965 was a city car produced from 1960 to 1963. Design of a car accessible to the public, and one in part taking the place of the soon to be discontinued Moskvitch 401, began in 1956. Following the growing trend of city cars (then accounting for between 25% and 40% of all European car sales), the minister in charge of Minavtroprom (the Soviet automotive ministry) Nikolay Strokin selected the new Fiat 600 as the model to follow. However, despite being visually similar to the Fiat, the ZAZ was in fact a completely different car.

The first prototype, the Moskvich-444, was designed by MZMA in October 1957; it used the same glass for front and rear windows. The prototype was first powered by a flat twin-cylinder MD-65 engine provided by the Irbitskiy Motorcycle Plant, which was "totally unsuited": it produced only  and lasted only  between major overhauls. As a result, a search for another engine was begun, and the success of the VW Type 1's boxer led to a preference for an air-cooled engine, which NAMI (the National Automobile Institute) had on the drawing board. Minavtroprom, however, preferred a  rear-mounted  V4, the NAMI-G, which had the additional advantage of being developed for the LuAZ-967. As a result, it had characteristics not common for automobile engines, including a magnesium alloy engine block. (This engine, the MeMZ 965, would be built by the Melitopolski Motor Plant, MeMZ.) It had the drawback of needing to have the rear of the car redesigned to fit, as well as needing a new rear suspension. The influence of the LuAZ designers led to the introduction of independent suspension on all four wheels. Its front doors open in a manner like suicide doors,  partly to make it more accessible to the disabled.

One of the primary differences was that the engine, which featured a V4 layout in place of the Fiat's inline-four, was air-cooled. The Zaporozhets also featured bigger wheels and front suspension on torsion bars. In 1958, the government ordered production of the car in the reformed ZAZ factory, under its final designation ZAZ-965. All further production of the car was carried out there.

The new car was approved for production at the MeMZ factory 28 November 1958, changing the name to ZAZ (Zaporizhzhia Automobile Building Plant) to reflect the new profile. The Zaporizhzhia factory was supplemented with the Mikoyan Diesel-Building Factory in Melitopol, which was part of the Soyuzdiesel combinat.

The first car, dubbed the ZAZ-965 Zaporozhets, was delivered 12 June 1959, was approved 25 July 1960, and entered production 25 October. The Zaporozhets was priced at 1,800 redenominated roubles.

There was also a car-derived van model for the Soviet post office, the 965S, with right-hand drive and blanked-off windows.

ZAZ-965A

The 965A was an improvement on the 965 and was produced from November 1962 to May 1969. In total, 322,106 units of the 965 were produced.
It was powered by a MeMZ 965 rear-mounted, air-cooled OHV  V4 engine, partially of aluminium design, producing . From November 1966 some cars were fitted with the slightly more powerful  MeMZ-965A engine. The 965's modest engine output has given ground to an urban joke that it was used as a starter motor in Soviet tanks.

As Soviet drivers were expected to do much of the servicing themselves, and auto workshops were in short supply anyway, the engine's 90° V4 layout proved more practical, especially in harsh winter conditions. The higher centre of gravity of the engine also provided superior traction on steep slopes, though this advantage, which was also continued in later models, came at the expense of the car's infamous lack of cornering stability.

The 965A also had its versions for the disabled (ZAZ-965B, AB, AR), as well as a more luxurious export variant ZAZ-965AE Yalta.

Despite low prestige of those cars, they have shown an unbeaten accessibility and popularity among the Soviets, becoming the "car for pensioners and intellectuals". They were the cheapest Soviet-made cars. Quite a large number of them were produced in variants for disabled people, with modified steering.

Between November 1966 and May 1969 the 965A and its successor, the ZAZ966, were produced concurrently.

When production of the 965 ended, 322,116 had been built.

The 965 also inspired the 1962 prototype NAMI 086, named Sputnik (Fellow Traveller), with a   vee-twin (half an MeMZ 965), electromagnetic clutch and four-speed transmission. Fitted with four-wheel independent suspension and weighing just , intended for use by the disabled, it was never built.

It was never produced in quantity, either.

Second generation (1966-1994)

ZAZ-966 

The second generation of the Zaporozhets was a series of subcompact cars, production starting of the 966 in November 1966, although the prototype was first demonstrated in 1961. It had a completely restyled bodywork (done entirely by ZAZ), no longer resembling the Fiat 600 and arguably similar to the Chevrolet Corvair, Hillman Imp or the NSU Prinz. This was an effort to cure some of the 965's issues, such as torsion bars that lost tension, suicide doors, and engine overheating and noise. The engine was the   MeMZ 966A. A radio was standard equipment. The price had inched up, too, from 1,800 roubles at the 965's debut to 2,200 by 1969.

While featuring a larger two-door notchback saloon body, it still featured an air-cooled V4 engine and featured more prominent air intakes – the so-called "ears", although a decorative chrome grille was also present. The car's rear suspension was also replaced. The 966 started out as the simpler  ZAZ-966V (ЗАЗ-966В in Cyrillic) with the  engine from the 965A, which was also featured on all later models. Much like the 965A, the 966V was also produced in several special variants for the disabled (VR, VB, VB2 - until January 1973). It was produced in tandem with the 965 from November 1966 to May 1969.

ZAZ launched an upgraded 966B in 1968, powered by a new   MeMZ 968 V4, while the  966A-powered model became the 966-1 which was only ever produced in small numbers.

The 966 was discontinued in 1972, with the introduction of the ZAZ 968.

Nicknamed "Zapo" in the Eastern Bloc, the 966 was also popular in Western Europe, including some Scandinavian countries and France. Some markets swapped the original engine for a  Renault unit.

ZAZ-968

The ZAZ-968 and its modifications were produced from 1971 to 1980. It featured the same   MeMZ 968 V4 as the ZAZ 966, but the exterior design was slightly modernized. The most obvious alteration was replacing the fake chrome grille in the car's front with a horizontal chrome decoration. Among other changes was a less austere dashboard and better front brakes. The 968 was discontinued in 1978, having been produced simultaneously with the newer 968A since 1973, which was produced until 1980. It introduced new safety measures, including a new steering wheel and a plastic dashboard instead of the earlier metal one. The 968A also had its variants for the disabled (the ZAZ-968R, B, B2, AB, and AB2) with the   engine.

Toward the end of 1974, the up-market 968A debuted, surviving until 1979. Among its improvements was a padded dash, energy-absorbing (collapsing) steering column, and seats from the VAZ-2101. The export 968E (destined mostly for the Eastern Bloc) had headlights modified to meet international standards, a safety glass windscreen, and an anti-theft steering lock.

ZAZ-968M

In 1979, the 968 series was replaced by the modernized 968M. Prototyped in 1977, it had the "ears" removed and replaced much of the chrome exterior with black plastic. Its interior design was also upgraded, featuring a closed-space glove compartment and a slightly more modern dashboard. It was offered with either the MeMZ 968E (carbureted, low-compression for 76-octane fuel); 968GE (dual carburettor); or the MeMZ 968BE (8.4:1 compression, for 93-octane). Instead of the side-mounted "ears", the hood lid and rear quarter panels were louvered.

The 968M was the last Zaporozhets model and also spent the most time in production, spanning a career from 1979 to 1 June 1994. Some of its special variants include the ZAZ-968MB2, for drivers who had only one foot, the ZAZ-968MB for drivers who had no feet.

Export versions
Among the export variants produced by ZAZ were ZAZ-965E, ZAZ-965AE, ZAZ-966E, ZAZ-968E, and ZAZ-968AE, which had improved features compared to vehicles made for the home market. Depending on target markets, commercial names Jalta or Eliette were used for these models.

In total, 3,422,444 Zaporozhets vehicles were manufactured and powered by air-cooled engines from the Melitopol factory from 1960 to 1994.

In popular culture

In the 1963 Soviet romantic comedy, Three Plus Two, the ZAZ-965 with plate number 18-15-лдг is featured in numerous scenes throughout the movie and is even referred to directly in the script as "A tin can of the Zaporozhets system"

In the 1995 James Bond film GoldenEye Bond's CIA contact Jack Wade drove a 1963 ZAZ 965A.

In the 2011 animated feature film, Cars 2, Vladimir Trunkov, Petrov Trunkov, Lubewig, and Tolga Trunkov are based on the ZAZ-968 Zaporozhets.

In Half-Life 2 the car is shown as a junked prop that clutters the road.

See also
Similar air-cooled and rear-engined vehicles:
 Chevrolet Corvair
 NSU Prinz 4
 Hillman Imp
 Hino Contessa
Volkswagen Type 3

References

ZAZ vehicles
Rear-engined vehicles
Rear-wheel-drive vehicles
Soviet automobiles
Soviet brands
Ukrainian brands
1960s cars
1970s cars
1980s cars
1990s cars
City cars
Subcompact cars
Sedans
Cars introduced in 1960
Cars discontinued in 1994